Kinn is an island in Kinn Municipality which is in Vestland county, Norway. The island can be reached by ferry from the town of Florø.

Geography 
The  island is dominated by a large mountain, with all its residents living on the east side.  The mountain, Kinnaklova, is a very notable landmark to sailors in the region since it has a deep ravine that cuts through the center of the peak.

History 
The island is the home to the historic Kinn Church, dating back to the 12th century. The church was the seat of the large parish of Kinn and used as an election church (Norwegian: valgkirke) for centuries. The island was also the centre (and namesake) of the old municipality of Kinn which existed from 1838 until 1964. The Kinnaspelet, a historical play, is performed on the island every summer.

Etymology 
The island was named after the old Kinn farm (Old Norse: Kinn) since Kinn Church is located there. The name is identical with the word for "cheek", referring to the steep slope of a mountain on the island.  Historically, the name was spelled Kind.

See also
List of islands of Norway

References

Islands of Vestland
Kinn